Exercise intensity refers to how much energy is expended when exercising. Perceived intensity varies with each person. It has been found that intensity has an effect on what fuel the body uses and what kind of adaptations the body makes after exercise. Intensity is the amount of physical power (expressed as a percentage of the maximal oxygen consumption) that the body uses when performing an activity. For example, exercise intensity defines how hard the body has to work to walk a mile in 20 minutes.

Measures of Intensity
Heart Rate is typically used as a measure of exercise intensity. Heart rate can be an indicator of the challenge to the cardiovascular system that the exercise represents.

The most precise measure of intensity is oxygen consumption (VO2). VO2 represents the overall metabolic challenge that an exercise imposes. There is a direct linear relationship between intensity of aerobic exercise and VO2. Our maximum intensity is a reflection of our maximal oxygen consumption (VO2 max). Such a measurement represents a cardiovascular fitness level.

VO2 is measured in METs (mL/kg/min). One MET, which is equal to 3.5 mL/kg per minute, is considered to be the average resting energy expenditure of a typical human being. Intensity of exercise can be expressed as multiples of resting energy expenditure. An intensity of exercise equivalent to 6 METs means that the energy expenditure of the exercise is six times the resting energy expenditure. 
 
Intensity of exercise can be expressed in absolute or relative terms. For example, two individuals with different measures of VO2 max, running at 7 mph are running at the same absolute intensity (miles/hour) but a different relative intensity (% of VO2 max expended). The individual with the higher VO2 max is running at a lower intensity at this pace than the individual with the lower VO2 max is.

Some studies measure exercise intensity by having subjects perform exercise trials to determine peak power output, which may be measured in watts, heart rate, or average cadence (cycling). This approach attempts to gauge overall workload.

Intensity Levels
Exercise is categorized into three different intensity levels. These levels include low, moderate, and vigorous and are measured by the metabolic equivalent of task (aka metabolic equivalent or METs).
The effects of exercise are different at each intensity level (i.e. training effect). Recommendations to lead a healthy lifestyle vary for individuals based on age, weight, and existing activity levels. “Published guidelines for healthy adults state that 20-60 minutes of medium intensity continuous or intermittent aerobic activity 3-5 times per week is needed for developing and maintaining cardiorespiratory fitness, body composition, and muscular strength.”

Fuel Used
The body uses different amounts of energy substrates (carbohydrates or fats) depending on the intensity of the exercise and the heart rate of the exerciser. Protein is a third energy substrate, but it contributes minimally and is therefore discounted in the percent contribution graphs reflecting different intensities of exercise. The fuel provided by the body dictates an individual's capacity to increase the intensity level of a given activity. In other words, the intensity level of an activity determines the order of fuel recruitment. Specifically, exercise physiology dictates that low intensity, long duration exercise provides a larger percentage of fat contribution in the calories burned because the body does not need to quickly and efficiently produce energy (i.e., adenosine triphosphate) to maintain the activity. On the other hand, high intensity activity utilizes a larger percentage of carbohydrates in the calories expended because its quick production of energy makes it the preferred energy substrate for high intensity exercise. High intensity activity also yields a higher total caloric expenditure.

This table outlines the estimated distribution of energy consumption at different intensity levels for a healthy 20-year-old with a Max Heart Rate (MHR) of 200.

These estimates are valid only when glycogen reserves are able to cover the energy needs. If a person depletes glycogen reserves after a long workout (a phenomenon known as "hitting the wall") or during a low carbohydrate diet, the body will shift into ketosis and use mostly fat and muscle for energy. Intermittent fasting can be used to train the body to shift easily into ketosis.

See also
Exercise physiology
Human power
Bioenergetic systems

References

Physical exercise